Christ Appearing to his Mother after his Resurrection is a 1554 oil on canvas painting by Titian. He painted it whilst in Medole in Mantua, where he was staying with the archpriest of Assunzione della Vergine, the town's parish church, the church in which it still hangs. It forms part of a series of works planned in his old age by the artist and it is his only altarpiece still in the province or city of Mantua.

Along with the titular figures, to the left the work also shows Noah, Abraham, Adam (carrying Christ's cross) and Eve, all just released during Christ's Harrowing of Hell. It formed part of the major 1935 retrospective of the artist's work in Venice. It was stolen in April 1968 but returned on 12 May the same year, but the work was damaged during the robbery and was subsequently sent to the Istituto Centrale del Restauro in Rome until being returned to the church in 1971. It then appeared in Mantua as part of the 1974 exhibition "Tesori d'arte nella terra dei Gonzaga".

References

Religious paintings by Titian
1554 paintings
Paintings in the Province of Mantua
Paintings of the Resurrection of Christ
Paintings of the Virgin Mary
Paintings depicting Abraham
Paintings depicting Adam and Eve
Paintings depicting Noah
Angels in art
Harrowing of Hell
Altarpieces